Trigonopterus latipes is a species of flightless weevil in the genus Trigonopterus from Indonesia.

Etymology
The specific name is derived from the Latin words latus, meaning "wide", and pes, meaning "foot".  It refers to the size of the protarsi.

Description
Individuals measure 2.86–3.03 mm in length.  General coloration is black, with rust-colored legs and antennae.  The protarsi are also black.

Range

Phylogeny
T. latipes is part of the T. dimorphus species group.

References

latipes
Beetles described in 2014
Beetles of Asia
Insects of Indonesia